The Warwickshire Rugby Football Union is a governing body for rugby union in part of The Midlands, England. The union is the constituent body of the Rugby Football Union for the city of Coventry and the county of Warwickshire. The current president is Steve Wilkes of the Old Coventrians club.

History
The Warwickshire RFU was created in 1914, after ceding from the now defunct Midland Counties Rugby Union.

County team
Warwickshire play in the County Championship. As of 2017, the representative side competes in Division 2.  However, in the past, the county competed at a much higher level, winning the Bill Beaumont Cup (as it is now known) 10 times, the fourth best record in the competition.

Honours
 Bill Beaumont Cup: Winners 10 times; runners up 5 times
 County Championship Plate: Winners (2): 2002, 2007

Affiliated Clubs
There are currently 44 clubs affiliated with the union, with teams at both senior and junior level and are based in Warwickshire. The vast majority of the county's clubs compete in the Rugby Football Union Midland Division, with the exception of Coventry RFC (The English Championship) and the University Teams (who compete in the British Universities and Colleges Sport rugby competitions). In addition there are 4 District Unions who form the Inter-District Competition Committee. Warwickshire Schools Rugby Union consist of five schools districts: Coventry Schools, South Warwickshire Schools, North Warwickshire Schools, Rugby Schools and Solihull Schools.

 A.E.I.
 Alcester
 Atherstone
 Barkers Butts
 Bedworth
 Berkswell & Balsall
 Broadstreet
 Claverdon
 Coventrians
 Coventry
 Coventry & Mid-Warwickshire
 Coventry Corsairs
 Coventry Saracens
 Coventry University
 Coventry Welsh
 Dunlop
 Earlsdon
 Harbury
 Kenilworth
 Keresley
 Leamington
 Manor Park
 Newbold-on-Avon
 Nuneaton Old Edwardians
 Nuneaton
 Nuneaton & North Warwickshire
 Old Coventrians
 Old Laurentians
 Old Leamingtonians
 Old Wheatleyans
 Pinley
 Rugby Lions
 Rugby St Andrews
 Rugby Welsh
 Rugby & District
 Shipston-on-Stour
 Shottery
 Silhillians
 Southam
 South Warwickshire
 Spartans
 Stoke Old Boys
 Stratford-upon-Avon
 Sutton Coldfield
 Trinity Guild
 University of Warwick 
 Warwickshire Masonic
 46 ER's

County club competitions 

The Warwickshire RFU currently runs the following competitions for club sides based in Warwickshire:

Cups

Warwickshire Cup
Warwickshire Shield
Warwickshire Vase

Discontinued competitions

Staffordshire/Warwickshire 1 – tier 7-10 league for Staffordshire and Warwickshire clubs that ran between 1987 and 2000
Staffordshire/Warwickshire 2 – tier 10-11 league for Staffordshire and Warwickshire clubs that ran between 1992 and 1996
Staffordshire/Warwickshire 3 – tier 11-12 league for Staffordshire and Warwickshire clubs that ran between 1992 and 1996
Staffordshire/Warwickshire 4 – tier 12-13 league for Staffordshire and Warwickshire clubs that ran between 1992 and 1996
Warwickshire 1 - tier 8-10 league that ran intermittently between 1987 and 2006
Warwickshire 2 - tier 9-10 league that ran intermittently between 1987 and 2006
Warwickshire 3 - tier 10 league that ran between 1987 and 1992

Notes

See also
Midland Division
English rugby union system

References

External links
 Warwickshire RFU website
 https://www.englandrugby.com
 https://www.warwickref.com

Rugby union governing bodies in England
Sport in Coventry
Rugby union in Warwickshire